The name "Miramichi" was first applied to a region in the northeast of New Brunswick, Canada, and has since been applied to other places in Canada and the United States. Although other interpretations have been suggested, it is believed that "Miramichi" was derived from the Montagnais words "Maissimeu Assi" (meaning Mi'kmaq Land), and was perhaps introduced for use in European languages by Jacques Cartier in 1535.

Miramichi is used in the names of many places, including:

Settlements

Canada

New Brunswick
Miramichi, New Brunswick, a city in northern New Brunswick
Nelson-Miramichi, New Brunswick, a dissolved community that was merged into Miramichi in a 1995 municipal amalgamation

New Brunswick electoral districts
 Miramichi—Grand Lake, the current federal electoral district
Miramichi, an earlier federal electoral district in New Brunswick (known as Northumberland and later as Northumberland-Miramichi)
Miramichi (provincial electoral district)
Miramichi-Bay du Vin, a provincial electoral district for New Brunswick
Southwest Miramichi, a provincial electoral district for New Brunswick
Miramichi Centre, a provincial electoral district for New Brunswick
Miramichi Bay-Neguac, a provincial electoral district for New Brunswick

Nova Scotia
 Miramichi, Nova Scotia, a community in Inverness County, Nova Scotia

Ontario
 Miramichi, a geographical area in Sudbury District, Ontario
 Pembroke, Ontario, formerly known as Miramichi, Canada West (ca. 1828-1850)

United States
 Miramichi, a community in Middletown, Connecticut
 Miramichi, an historic post office in Hamilton County, Nebraska

Geographic features

Canada

New Brunswick

 Miramichi River
Southwest Miramichi River
Northwest Miramichi River
Little Southwest Miramichi River
Miramichi Valley, a region frequently shortened to simply "Miramichi"
 Miramichi Highlands, a physiographic region of New Brunswick
 Miramichi Lake, a lake lying at the headwaters of the Southwest Miramichi River in York County, New Brunswick
 Miramichi Bay, an estuary of the Gulf of St. Lawrence

Nova Scotia
 Miramichi Brook, a stream in Inverness County, Nova Scotia

Ontario
 Miramichi Bay, a bay in Bruce County, Ontario
 Miramichi Island, an island in Muskoka District, Ontario
 Miramichi Island, an island in Parry Sound District, Ontario
 Muskrat River, Ontario (near Pembroke) - formerly known as Miramichi River

Yukon
 Miramichi Glacier

United States
 Miramichi Lake, a lake in Osceola County, Michigan
 Lake Mirimichi, a reservoir in Norfolk County, Massachusetts

Other places
 Miramichi Bridge, a bridge crossing the Miramichi River at Newcastle, New Brunswick, Canada

See also
Miramichi (disambiguation)

References

Broad-concept articles
16th century in Canada
Innu
Geography of New Brunswick
Names of places in the United States
Names of places in Canada